Carter John "Bud" O'Rourke Jr. (January 14, 1919 – November 24, 2001) was an American professional basketball player. He played for the Chicago American Gears in the National Basketball League for six games during the 1945–46 season and averaged 0.3 points per game.

References

1919 births
2001 deaths
United States Army personnel of World War II
American men's basketball players
Basketball players from Chicago
Chicago American Gears players
DePaul Blue Demons men's basketball players
Forwards (basketball)
Professional Basketball League of America players